Orlovka is a rural locality (a village) and the administrative center of Orlovsky Selsoviet, Arkhangelsky District, Bashkortostan, Russia. The population was 300 as of 2010. There are 5  streets.

Geography 
Orlovka is located 19 km southwest of Arkhangelskoye (the district's administrative centre) by road. Akkulevo is the nearest rural locality.

References 

Rural localities in Arkhangelsky District